Anti-humor is a type of indirect and alternative humor that involves the joke-teller's delivering something that is intentionally not funny, or lacking in intrinsic meaning. The practice relies on the expectation on the part of the audience of something humorous, and when this does not happen, the irony itself is of comedic value. Anti-humor is also the basis of various types of pranks and hoaxes.

The humor of such jokes is based on the surprise factor of absence of an expected joke or of a punch line in a narration that is set up as a joke. This kind of anticlimax is similar to that of the shaggy dog story. In fact, some researchers see the "shaggy dog story" as a type of anti-joke. Anti-humor is described as a form of irony or reversal of expectations that may provoke an emotion opposite to humor, such as fear, pain, disgust, awkwardness, or discomfort.

Examples

The yarn, also called a shaggy dog story, is a type of anti-humor that involves telling an extremely long joke with an intricate (and sometimes grisly) back story and surreal or repetitive plotline, before ending the story with either a weak spoonerism, or abruptly stopping with no real punchline at all, or no soap, radio.

The obvious punchline involves narratives that are structured like a traditional joke including a set-up and punchline, but whose punchline is the most obvious to the narrative; an example of this is Why did the chicken cross the road? Another example are the "What did the farmer say/do" set of jokes, which include various situations where the joke teller asks the listener what the farmer did in any given situation:

A: What did the farmer say when he lost his tractor?
B: I don't know, what did the farmer say when he lost his tractor?
A: "Where's my tractor?"

The unobvious punchline involves narratives that are structured traditionally to include a set-up and punchline and whose set-up typically suggests a risqué punchline, but whose actual punchline is the opposite of what the listener is anticipating:

"Did you hear about the honeymooners who confused the tube of K-Y Jelly with window putty? Quite the tragedy, all the windows fell out of their new home."

The no-punchline involves a narrative that begins with a traditional structure (set-up and punchline) but which has no punchline or an incomplete punchline. This type of joke tends to have two targets, the main listener and an audience, and is meant to confuse the listener who does not know that there is not supposed to be a punchline while entertaining the audience which does.

"I was asked if I've ever had a job that I hated. When I was in college, I was often strapped for cash."

In stand-up comedy
Alternative comedy, among its other aspects, parodies the traditional idea of the joke as a form of humor. Anti-humor jokes are also often associated with deliberately bad stand-up comedians. Stand-up comedian Andy Kaufman had his own unique brand of anti-humor, quasi-surrealist acts coupled with performance art; one of his best-known manifestations of this was his act as the fictional persona of Tony Clifton, an untalented lounge lizard entertainer. Norm Macdonald was another comedian sometimes associated with performing anti-humor, although he objected to the characterization.

See also

References

Humour
Postmodernism
Stand-up comedy